Marvin Ajani (born 4 October 1993) is a German footballer who plays as a right midfielder for MSV Duisburg.

Career
After several years at Düsseldorf, Aachen, Halle and Wiesbaden, he joined MSV Duisburg for the 2021–22 season.

Career statistics

References

External links

1993 births
Living people
German footballers
People from Ratingen
Sportspeople from Düsseldorf (region)
German sportspeople of Nigerian descent
Footballers from North Rhine-Westphalia
Association football midfielders
SV Wehen Wiesbaden players
Hallescher FC players
Alemannia Aachen players
Fortuna Düsseldorf II players
Fortuna Düsseldorf players
FC Wegberg-Beeck players
MSV Duisburg players
2. Bundesliga players
3. Liga players
Oberliga (football) players